Homeobox protein DLX-2 is a protein that in humans is encoded by the DLX2 gene.

Many vertebrate homeo box-containing genes have been identified on the basis of their sequence similarity with Drosophila developmental genes. Members of the Dlx gene family contain a homeobox that is related to that of Distal-less (Dll), a gene expressed in the head and limbs of the developing fruit fly. The Distal-less (Dlx) family of genes comprises at least 6 different members, DLX1-DLX6. The DLX proteins are postulated to play a role in forebrain and craniofacial development. This gene is located in a tail-to-tail configuration with another member of the gene family on the long arm of chromosome 2.

Interactions
DLX2 has been shown to interact with DLX5, MSX1 and Msh homeobox 2.

References

Further reading